Zvezdan is a suburb in the city of Zaječar, Serbia. According to the 2002 census, the settlement had a population of 1,675.

References

Populated places in Zaječar District